Lycée Jean Moulin is a senior high school in Torcy, Seine-et-Marne, in the Paris metropolitan area. It first opened in 1985.

, the school was under capacity, as it had 508 students even though the school had space for 1,000 students. At the same time, the student populations of Lycée Martin-Luther-King in Bussy-Saint-Georges and Lycée Emilie-Brontë in Lognes were increasing.

References

Further reading
 Demande du maintien de l’ouverture d’une classe de Seconde Demande du maintien de la deuxième classe de Terminale Scientifique actuelle à 35 élèves

External links
 Lycée Jean Moulin 

Lycées in Marne-la-Vallée
Lycées in Seine-et-Marne
1985 establishments in France
Educational institutions established in 1985